Pablo Casar Bustillo (born 17 September 1978) is a Spanish retired footballer who played as a central defender.

Football career
Born in Cabezón de la Sal, Cantabria, Casar spent most of his professional career with local Racing de Santander, making his debuts as a senior with the reserves in the lower leagues. He played his first game in La Liga on 19 June 1999, coming on as a second-half substitute in a 0–2 home loss against Real Valladolid.

Casar's best input with his main club occurred in the 2003–04 season, when he scored one goal while starting in all his 32 appearances to help the side narrowly avoid relegation after finishing in 17th position. Released in January 2006 he resumed his career in Segunda División, representing Valladolid and Deportivo Alavés; in the 2009–10 campaign he played with Panthrakikos F.C. from Greece, after which he retired at the age of 31.

References

External links

1978 births
Living people
Spanish footballers
Footballers from Cantabria
Association football defenders
La Liga players
Segunda División players
Segunda División B players
Tercera División players
Rayo Cantabria players
Racing de Santander players
Real Valladolid players
Deportivo Alavés players
Super League Greece players
Panthrakikos F.C. players
Spain youth international footballers
Spanish expatriate footballers
Expatriate footballers in Greece